Two total lunar eclipses occurred in 1985: 

 4 May 1985 lunar eclipse
 28 October 1985 lunar eclipse

See also 
 List of 20th-century lunar eclipses
 Lists of lunar eclipses